Suzanne Dehelly (1896–1968) was a French film actress.

Selected filmography

 Graziella (1926) - Graziella
 A Hole in the Wall (1930) - La couturière
 La prison en folie (1931) - Cléo d'Argyl
 Tout s'arrange (1931) - Micheline
 Mon amant l'assassin (1932) - Simone Bondizi
 Une nuit de folies (1934) - Suzanne
 Les bleus de la marine (1934) - Elyane
 The Crisis is Over (1934) - Olga
 Un soir de bombe (1935) - Emma
 La mariée du régiment (1936)
 La petite dame du wagon-lit (1936) - Eudoxie
 La brigade en jupons (1936) - Frédérique
 Prête-moi ta femme (1936) - Angèle
 La reine des resquilleuses (1937) - Victorine
 Arsene Lupin, Detective (1937) - L'amie d'Olga (uncredited)
 Cinderella (1937) - Virginie
 Mon deputé et sa femme (1937) - La princesse
 Monsieur Bégonia (1938) - Aurélie Merchant
 Chipée (1938) - Mme Point
 Titin des Martigues (1938) - Totoche
 Ça... c'est du sport (1938) - Ernestine
 Une de la cavalerie (1938) - Léonie Vigoulette
 La présidente (1938) - Madame Tricointe
 Gargousse (1938) - Zozo
 Vacances payées (1938) - Sabine
 Mon oncle et mon curé (1939) - Suzon
 The Man Who Seeks the Truth (1940) - Madame Lamblin
 Marseille mes amours (1940) - Tante Zoé
 Premier rendez-vous (1941) - Mademoiselle Christophine
 Pension Jonas (1942) - Le baronne de Crochezoet
 Croisières sidérales (1942) - Georgette Marchand
 At Your Command, Madame (1942) - Odette Dupuis
 The Beautiful Adventure (1942) - Madame d'Éguzon
 Le grand combat (1942) - Antoinette
 Feu Nicolas (1943) - Madame Ballard
 La collection Ménard (1944) - Dora
 Le roi des resquilleurs (1945) - Arlette Sycleton / Carla
 Pas un mot à la reine mère (1946) - La reine Catherine de Neustrie
 Rouletabille joue et gagne (1947) - Florine
 L'idole (1948) - Valérie Jourdan
 Rouletabille contre la dame de pique (1948) - Florine
 Five Red Tulips (1949) - Colonelle
 My Aunt from Honfleur (1949) - Mme Raymond, la tante d'Honfleur
 At the Grand Balcony (1949) - Mlle Françoise
 The Prize (1950) - Mlle Cadenat
 Olivia (1951) - Mademoiselle (Hortense) Dubois
 The Night Is My Kingdom (1951) - Soeur Gabrielle
 My Wife Is Formidable (1951) - La mère de Sylvia
 Ils sont dans les vignes... (1952) - Léontine Desbordes
 Double or Quits (1953) - Charlotte Nodier
 The Lottery of Happiness (1953) - Mme Lucas
 Les amours finissent à l'aube (1953) - Clémence Guéret
 El torero (1954) - Madre
 Huis clos (1954) - La vieille dame
 La Bande à papa (1956) - Gertrude, la grand-mère
 La garçonne (1957) - Aunt Sylvestre
 Sénéchal the Magnificent (1957) - La malade
 Fumée blonde (1957) - Tante Esther
 Police judiciaire (1958) - Pauline Georges
 Le temps des oeufs durs (1958) - Armande Grillot
 School for Coquettes (1958) - Mme. Bernoux
 La Valse du Gorille (1959) - Hortense
 Les livreurs (1961) - La belle-mère
 Cadavres en vacances (1963) - Blanche Bodin (final film role)

References

Bibliography
 Greco, Joseph. The File on Robert Siodmak in Hollywood, 1941-1951. Universal-Publishers, 1999.

External links

1896 births
1968 deaths
French film actresses
French silent film actresses
20th-century French actresses
Actresses from Paris